Plays Live is the first live and fifth album overall by English rock musician Peter Gabriel. His first not titled simply Peter Gabriel, it was originally issued as a double album and long-play cassette in 1983, with sixteen songs. It was rereleased in 1985, as a single CD called Plays Live (Highlights) with only twelve songs, some of which are edited so the album fits on a single disc. It was rereleased in its entirety as a double CD set in 1987. In 2002, a remaster of the Highlights version was issued. In 2019, the complete double-LP version was released on streaming platforms for the first time. 

In 2021 the original 2CD version was released in remastered form. The sound recordings copyright (p) date featured on the back of the package suggests this had actually been remastered at the same time as the rest of Gabriel's back catalogue in 2002.

"Plays Live" concerts were recorded at:

 Braden Auditorium, Illinois State University, Normal, Illinois, 3 December 1982
 Memorial Hall, Kansas City, Kansas, 4 December 1982
 Chick Evans Field House, Northern Illinois University, DeKalb, Illinois, 6 December 1982
 SIU Arena, Southern Illinois University, Carbondale, Illinois, 7 December 1982

Liner notes by "the producers" admit, "Although this album was compiled from four concerts in the mid-West of the United States, some additional recording took place not a thousand miles away from the home of the artist. The generic term for this process is 'cheating'. Care has been taken to keep the essence of the gigs intact, including 'human imperfection'."

Armando Gallo took the cover photograph. "I was always listening to the music when I photographed a concert," he said. "Somehow my index finger pressed the clicker in time with the lights and the percussion - the heart of the music. I always felt grateful that I could shoot Peter’s entire shows. Once I asked Peter if he didn’t mind me being in the pit photographing his every move. 'No, I love to see a friendly face,' he answered. Making me feel good about it."

The album's previously unreleased "I Go Swimming" received airplay and made the US Mainstream Rock charts in 1983. The song was initially recorded for Gabriel's third album and was performed on his 1980 tour.

"I Don't Remember" was issued as a single, with an accompanying music video, in the UK.

Track listing
All songs written by Peter Gabriel.

Original vinyl release

Disc one
Side one
 "The Rhythm of the Heat" – 6:26
 "I Have the Touch" – 5:18
 "Not One of Us" – 5:29
 "Family Snapshot" – 4:44

Side two
 "D.I.Y." – 4:20
 "The Family and the Fishing Net" – 7:22
 "Intruder" – 5:03
 "I Go Swimming" – 4:44

Disc two
Side three
 "San Jacinto" – 8:27
 "Solsbury Hill" – 4:42
 "No Self Control" – 5:03
 "I Don't Remember" – 4:19

Side four
This side was recorded at Memorial Hall, Kansas City, Kansas on 4 December 1982.
 "Shock the Monkey" – 7:10
 "Humdrum" – 4:23
 "On the Air" – 5:22
 "Biko" – 7:01

Dual CD Version

Disc one
 "The Rhythm of the Heat" – 6:26
 "I Have the Touch" – 5:18
 "Not One of Us" – 5:29
 "Family Snapshot" – 4:44
 "D.I.Y." – 4:20
 "The Family and the Fishing Net" – 7:22
 "Intruder" – 5:03
 "I Go Swimming" – 4:44

Disc two
 "San Jacinto" – 8:28
 "Solsbury Hill" – 4:40
 "No Self Control" – 5:02
 "I Don't Remember" – 4:20
 "Shock the Monkey" – 7:40
 "Humdrum" – 4:03
 "On the Air" – 5:20
 "Biko" – 6:50

Plays Live (Highlights)
 "I Have the Touch" – 4:47
 "Family Snapshot" – 4:47
 "D.I.Y." – 4:05
 "The Family and the Fishing Net" – 7:38
 "I Go Swimming" – 4:54
 "San Jacinto" – 8:19
 "Solsbury Hill" – 4:41
 "No Self Control" – 5:04
 "I Don't Remember" – 4:12
 "Shock the Monkey" – 7:10
 "Humdrum" – 4:21
 "Biko" – 6:52

Personnel
 Peter Gabriel – lead vocals, piano, synthesizers
 Jerry Marotta – drums, percussion, backing vocals
 Tony Levin – bass guitar, chapman stick, backing vocals
 David Rhodes – guitars, backing vocals
 Larry Fast – synthesizers, piano, keyboards
 Peter Walsh – editing, mixing, "cheating"
 Greg Fulginiti - mastering

Charts

References

External links

Plays Live at Discogs.com
Plays Live – Highlights at Discogs.com

Peter Gabriel albums
1983 live albums
Charisma Records live albums
Geffen Records live albums
Albums produced by Peter Walsh